Octagonal Schoolhouse, Octagonal School or Octagon School, etc.,  may refer to:

 Sheldon Jackson School, Sitka, Alaska, a property listed on the NRHP
 Octagonal Schoolhouse (Cowgill's Corner, Delaware), a property listed on the NRHP
 Charter Oak Schoolhouse, Schuline, Illinois, a property listed on the NRHP
 Octagonal School, in Watkins Woolen Mill State Park and State Historic Site, Lawson, Missouri, a property listed on the NRHP
 Modern Times School, Brentwood, New York, a property listed on the NRHP
 Octagonal Schoolhouse (Essex, New York), a property listed on the NRHP
 Dryden District School No. 5, Dryden, New York, a property listed on the NRHP
 Birmingham Friends Octagonal School, Birmingham Township, Chester County, Pennsylvania, a property listed on the NRHP
 Sodom Schoolhouse, Montandon, Pennsylvania, a property listed on the NRHP
 Hood Octagonal School, Newtown Township, Pennsylvania, a property listed on the NRHP
 Octagon Stone Schoolhouse, South Canaan, Pennsylvania, a property listed on the NRHP
 Wrightstown Octagonal Schoolhouse, Wrightstown, Pennsylvania, a property listed on the NRHP

See also
 List of octagonal buildings and structures in the United States